The Linden Hill School was a boys' middle school in Northfield, Massachusetts that served students with dyslexia and other language-related learning disabilities. It ceased operations on June 8, 2012 due to financial problems.

History 
In 1961, George Hayes and his wife Penny established a boarding school that emphasized on reading and language acquisition. They wanted a lot that was comfortable inside with plenty of space outdoors to learn and play. They bought a dairy farm from Grace Bennett, whose grandson was taught by Hayes at Mount Hermon. The school accommodated 30 boys with language-based disabilities.

Campus
Linden Hill School's 15-acre campus was located about four miles south of Northfield town center. In addition to many purpose-built classrooms, the school building houses classrooms, an indoor basketball court with a climbing wall, a game room, a first aid room and, of course, a large kitchen and cafeteria. There were five buildings on campus, including three dorms. The dormitories had 50 single-occupancy rooms and spacious common rooms with kitchenettes.

Sexual abuse

Michael Holland

In 2003, Michael P. Holland, the longtime headmaster of Linden Hill, stepped down after multiple allegations of sexual abuse.  As of 2021, he has been accused of sexual abuse at both Linden Hill and Gow School in South Wales, New York.

In the 1990s, while a teacher and headmaster at Gow School, Holland allegedly sexually assaulted and raped 14-year-old Tarek L. Adam, who lived in the dormitory he oversaw. This abuse may have gone on for more than four years (1992—1996+). Holland denied this claim.

The Commonwealth of Massachusetts Office of Child Care Services (OCCS) cited Linden Hill School for unlicensed rooms that students were staying in, in the headmaster’s quarters in 1999. Holland had come to Linden Hill in 1998.

While on a school trip to a conference in New York City in March 2003, Holland inappropriately touched a 15-year-old student in a hotel room. Another student on the trip called Linden Hill to report the misconduct. Holland was charged with forcible touching in the third degree, endangering the welfare of a child, and sexual abuse in the third degree.He was placed on leave.

In 2003, an unnamed Linden Hill student also accused Holland of inappropriate touching while on campus. Either this student or another accused Holland of assault after the student stayed over in the headmaster's quarters, as students often did if they were sick or stressed. Shortly after, in early 2004, one of Holland's students at Gow, reached out to the school "to state that he had been involved in an inappropriate relationship with Holland many years prior." While he was convicted in New York, Massachusetts acquitted Holland in 2005 of felony charges on grounds of failure to provide incriminating evidence.

In 2006, Linden Hill filed a lawsuit against former headmaster Michael Holland, stating in the complaint, “As a direct and proximate of Holland’s breaches Linden Hill School has incurred substantial damages” in an attempt to recover lost revenue and costs resulting mainly from Holland’s sexual abuse publicity which resulted in a drastic drop in enrollment.

Thomas Simmeth
Like Holland, Thomas Simmeth taught at both Gow School and Linden Hill. While at Gow, he is alleged to have groomed and raped Aaron Worby, a student who hours before the attack had told Simmeth he was gay. In 2020, at least three people had recently reported an inappropriate relationship with Simmeth while at school. Another student, also at Gow in the 1990s, alleged that Simmeth put him in a chokehold, despite repeated attempts over several other occasions to get him to stop, until he lost unconsciousness. Following the incident, the students' friends harassed Simmeth with comments that their classmates quickly picked up on. At the end of the academic year, Simmeth asked the student to stop "with the jokes."

In the late 1990s, a former student's parents contacted Gow to report that Simmeth had sexually abused their son. Because the student was never spoken to directly, details are limited. Shortly after arriving at Linden Hill, Simmeth was charged with "indecent assault and battery" in February 2002. The court found him not guilty in October 2004. He was fired in 2003. In 2019, a former student filed a lawsuit against Gow, but not Simmeth, about the sexual abuse he endured from Simmeth while a student there. As of 2020, this lawsuit is still pending.

Closure
Hit hard by recession and sexual abuse cases, Linden Hill School sold its campus in 2012 to pay off its mortgage and pay off significant debt. In 2013, the Redemption Church of Christ of the Apostolic Faith purchased the schools campus for $2.56 million with the intent to erect an agriculture school modeled on Tuskegee University. In May 2019, the Church turned the campus over to their lien holder in lieu of foreclosure. As of June 2019, the campus was owned by MWD Asset Servicing Inc, the lien holder.

Notable alumni
 Trevor Ferrell

References

External links
 Linden Hill School website
 Linden Hill at Boarding School Review

Defunct boys' schools in the United States
Boarding schools in Massachusetts
Schools in Franklin County, Massachusetts
1961 establishments in Massachusetts
Special schools in the United States
Educational institutions established in 1961
Christian schools in Massachusetts
Educational institutions disestablished in 2012
School sexual abuse scandals
Special education in the United States
Boys' schools in Massachusetts